Dahlgren is a Swedish surname.

Geographical distribution
As of 2014, 51.5% of all known bearers of the surname Dahlgren were residents of Sweden (frequency 1:1,568), 37.6% of the United States (1:78,773), 2.7% of Finland (1:16,759), 2.3% of Canada (1:130,028), 2.2% of Norway (1:19,260) and 1.5% of Denmark (1:31,711).

In Sweden, the frequency of the surname was higher than national average (1:1,568) in the following counties:
 1. Västerbotten County (1:699)
 2. Gotland County (1:991)
 3. Värmland County (1:1,075)
 4. Jämtland County (1:1,145)
 5. Halland County (1:1,167)
 6. Västra Götaland County (1:1,257)
 7. Östergötland County (1:1,314)
 8. Västernorrland County (1:1,410)

In Finland, the frequency of the surname was higher than national average (1:16,759) in the following regions:
 1. Åland (1:1,700)
 2. Ostrobothnia (1:4,345)
 3. Central Ostrobothnia (1:4,458)
 4. Tavastia Proper (1:6,964)
 5. Uusimaa (1:10,597)

People
Anders Dahlgren (1925–1986), Swedish politician who was a member of the Centre Party

Charles G. Dahlgren (1811–1888), Confederate brigadier general during the American Civil War
Dagmar Dahlgren (1880–1951), American singer and silent film era motion picture actress
Babe Dahlgren (1912–1996), American baseball player
Edward C. Dahlgren (1916–2006), United States Army soldier
Eva Dahlgren (born 1960), Swedish singer
Fredrik August Dahlgren (1816–1895) Swedish writer, playwright and songwriter
George Dahlgren (1887–1940),  player in the National Football League
Gertrud Dahlgren (1931–2009), Swedish botanist
Jay Dahlgren (born 1948), Canadian javelin thrower
Jeff Dahlgren, American guitarist and producer
Jennifer Dahlgren (born 1984), Argentinian athlete
John A. Dahlgren (1809–1870), Rear Admiral, U.S. Navy officer
John Olof Dahlgren (1872–1963), American Medal of Honor recipient
Karl Fredrik Dahlgren (1791–1844), Swedish poet
Kevin Dahlgren (1992–2018), American convicted of a quadruple murder in the Czech Republic
Leif Dahlgren (1906–1998), Swedish decathlete
Madeleine Vinton Dahlgren (1825-1898; pen name, "Corinne"), American writer, translator, anti-suffragist
Mathias Dahlgren (born 1969), Swedish chef, who won the culinary championship Bocuse d'Or in 1997
Mikael Dahlgren (born 1984), Swedish footballer who currently plays for Landskrona BoIS
Robert Dahlgren (born 1979), Swedish auto racing driver
Rolf Dahlgren (1932–1987), Swedish-Danish botanist
Ulric Dahlgren (1842–1864), Colonel, U.S. Army officer

References

Swedish-language surnames